OFC Vihren is a Bulgarian football club from the town of Sandanski, currently playing in the South-West Third League. Sandanski's home ground is the Sandanski Stadium in Sandanski with a capacity of 6,000. Vihren Sandanski's team colours are green and white.

Vihren was founded in 1925, changing its name several times during its early existence. Up until the early 2000s, Vihren played mostly in either the second or third tiers of Bulgarian football. Season 2004-05 is arguably the most important in the club's history, as the team managed to promote to the A PFG, or first tier of Bulgarian football, for the first time. Vihren managed to play four consecutive seasons in the elite, before suffering relegation after the 2008-09 season. Since then, the Gladiators have played mostly in the third regional tier.

Equipment
Currently the team's home kit is green and the away kit is white. Various combinations of green and white have been used through the years, but green remains the basic colour of the team.

History

The club was founded on 24 May 1925. It has carried the names Ustrem, Gotse Delchev, Yane Sandanski and Cherveno zname throughout its history.

For a very long period of its existence, Vihren was considered a minor club from southwest Bulgaria. It always stood in the shadows of the other more successful clubs from the region, such as Pirin Blagoevgrad, and Belasitsa Petrich, who regularly competed in the A Group.

In 1977, Vihren first promoted to the B Group, remaining there 13 consecutive seasons before falling back to the V Group. In 1993, Vihren returned to the B Group, but only for one season, after which relegation again followed.

In 2003, Vihren again returned to the second level. In the 2004–05 season, Vihren finished first and gained promotion to the A Group for the 2005–06 season, marking the team's debut in the top tier. Before their first year of playing in A PFG, Vihren's owner decided to bring players from other countries to bolster the team's chances of surviving in the top flight. His first signing was the ex-FC Porto player Jose Furtado. He was from the Portuguese side G.D. Tourizense for free. Brazilian player Serginio Dias, and Portuguese players Mauro Alexandre and Nuno Almeida were just a few other players who signed for Vihren after Furtado. The team coach was named Petar Zhekov. Vihren finished season 2005–06 on 9th place in A PFG with 30 points.

The next season, 2006-07, Vihren managed to gain 37 points, finishing in 9th place once again.

In season 2007–08, Vihren's owner, Konstantin Dinev decided to bring Portuguese coach Rui Dias. The club signed eight Portuguese and two Brazilian players. But three months later, Rui Dias was discharged for poor results. At the end of the season, the team finished in 10th place.

Season 2008–09 started excellent with a 1–0 win against Bulgarian vice-champion Levski Sofia. In the 4th round, the club defeated Lokomotov Sofia. In January 2008, Vihren signed notable Greek players Christos Maladenis and Dimitrios Zografakis. In the end of the season, however, the team finished in 14th place and were relegated to B Group, ending a four-year stint in the elite.

The following two seasons were spent in the second tier, but financial problems overwhelmed the club, forcing its folding in 2011 and withdrawal from the B Group. The next season, Vihren was refounded from the fourth level, the A RFG. The team then promoted to the V Group in 2013.

League positions

Honours
Bulgarian A PFG:
 9th place: 2005–06 and 2006–07
Bulgarian Cup:
 quarter finalist Cup of the Soviet Army: 1985/86

Current squad 
As of 1 August 2020

Managerial history
This is a list of the last ten Vihren managers:

As of December 31, 2009.

Notable players

Former foreign players

External links
 Official website 
 OFC Vihren Sandanski at bgclubs.eu

Association football clubs established in 1925
Vihren
Sandanski
1925 establishments in Bulgaria